Preventral scales are snake scales positioned anterior to the ventral scales and are wider than they are long, but do not come into contact with the paraventral row of dorsal scales on either side of the body.

Related scales
 Ventral scales
 Dorsal scales

References

Snake scales